This is a list of Canadian films which were released in 1992:

See also 
 1992 in Canada
 1992 in Canadian television

External links 
Feature Films Released In 1992 With Country of Origin Canada at IMDb

1992
1992 in Canadian cinema
Canada